Odoardo Tabacchi (Valganna, 19 December 1836 - Milan, 23 March 1905) was an Italian sculptor.

Biography
He trained in the Brera Academy starting in 1845, from here he studied with other sculptors in Milan, Rome (where in  1851 he wins a three-year stipend), Florence, and Naples. From 1860 to 1868 he opened a studio in Milan, afterwards he moved to Turin, where he became professor of the Albertina Academy of Fine Arts.

He was known for making copies of classic statuary, busts and reliefs. In 1870, in Parma  he displayed a statue depicting: La Peri. In 1872, he exhibited in Milan L Hypatria (Naples, 1877). He also completed a larger than life marble, later bronze, statue of Arnaldo da Brescia, exhibited in Turin in 1880. He made a portrait of Michelangelo Buonarroti for the 1883 Roman Exhibition. In Turin in 1884, he exhibited a sculptural group titled Libro pericoloso; and three busts Fiori del Ballo, Count Avogadro di Quaregna, and Dreamland.

His pupils include Giacomo Ginotti (1845-1897), Pietro Canonica (1869-1959), Davide Calandra (1856-1915), Giuseppe Realini, Emmanuel Villanis, Leonardo Bistolfi (1859-1933), and Antonio Stuardi.

References

1836 births
1905 deaths
19th-century Italian sculptors
Italian male sculptors
20th-century Italian sculptors
20th-century Italian male artists
Academic staff of Accademia Albertina
19th-century Italian male artists